Anthony Ant is a 1999 children's animated television series produced and distributed by HIT Entertainment for YTV and HBO Family. Based on a book of the same name by Graham Philpot and Lorna Philpot, it takes place in "Antville," an underground city. Anthony and his friends must avoid being stepped on by the "Bigfeet" (humans) who live on the surface.

Characters and voice cast
Anthony Ant (voiced by Alan Marriott) - The main character who lives with his family who work with the queen, his father and grandfather work in the museum, while he and his friends help solve problems caused by Count Mosquito.
Count Mosquito (voiced by Bob Saker) - The main antagonist in the programme who often tries to cause chaos with his nephews, the Gnat brothers, he is shown to be the princess's tutor, even though he is a mosquito.
Miss Weevil - (voiced by April Ford) - An anti-hero who often tries to use magic to get others to know her, such as the orb (marble), which was actually Anthony tricking her to wear a pizza pie on her head, which makes her a comic relief character.

Episodes

References

External links

 World's Greatest Unknown City, The New York Times

1990s American animated television series
1999 American television series debuts
1999 American television series endings
1990s British animated television series
1999 British television series debuts
1999 British television series endings
1990s Canadian animated television series
1999 Canadian television series debuts
1999 Canadian television series endings
American children's animated adventure television series
American children's animated comedy television series
American television shows based on children's books
British children's animated adventure television series
British children's animated comedy television series
British television shows based on children's books
Canadian children's animated adventure television series
Canadian children's animated comedy television series
Canadian television shows based on children's books
English-language television shows
YTV (Canadian TV channel) original programming
Television series by Mattel Creations
Animated television series about insects